Paul Russell may refer to:

 Paul Russell (philosopher) (born 1955), at Lund University & the University of British Columbia
 Rusty Russell (born 1973), Australian Linux kernel hacker, whose real name is Paul Russell
 Paul Russell (baseball) (1871–1957), Major League Baseball player
 Paul Russell (Gaelic footballer) (1906–1965), Irish sportsperson
 Paul Russell (novelist), author of The Coming Storm
 Paul Russell drummer for New Zealand band “Super Groove”
 Paul Russell (photographer) (born 1966), British street photographer
 Paul Russell, child actor in Peter Greenaway's Prospero's Books and The Cook, the Thief, His Wife & Her Lover
 Paul Russell, former bass player of Sleeping with Sirens
 Paul Fitzpatrick Russell (born 1959), American Roman Catholic archbishop and diplomat